The 1976 Nationals was the 11th Men's and second Women's Nationals. The Nationals was a team handball tournament to determine the National Champion from 1976 from the US.

Final ranking

Men's Open ranking

Men's Collegiate ranking

1 Air Force was represented by the men's varsity basketball team.
Sources:

Women's ranking

Women's Open ranking

Women's Collegiate ranking

Best ranked Collegiate teams in the Women's Open Division

References

USA Team Handball Nationals by year
Ohio State Buckeyes